Adimi Kalbine Yaz (Write My Name Across Your Heart) is Turkish pop singer Tarkan's studio album, and was released on 29 July 2010 in Turkey. The album sold more than 300,000 copies in the first week of its release and received the best album of the year award from Kral TV Music Awards.

Track listing

Credits
Arranged By – Gülşah Tütüncü (tracks: 8), Gürsel Çelik (tracks: 9, 12), Kivanch K.* (tracks: 13), Ozan Çolakoğlu (tracks: 1 to 8, 10), Suat Ateşdağlı (tracks: 11) 
Mastered By – Emily Lazar (tracks: 1), Joe LaPorta (tracks: 1) 
Mixed By – Levent Demirbaş (tracks: 1, 3, 4, 6, 7), Murat Matthew Erdem (tracks: 5), Yalçın Aşan (tracks: 11), Özgür Yurtoğlu (tracks: 2, 8, 9, 10, 12) 
Photography By – Giuliano Bekor 
Recorded By [Additional Vocals] – Emirhan Cengiz 
Recorded By [Percussions & Strings] – Bahadır Sağbaş (tracks: 3, 6) 
Recorded By, Recorded By [Vocals], Mastered By – Levent Demirbaş 
Words By [Redaction] – Handan Menekşe

Charts

Sales

Release

References

External links 
 Personal website

Tarkan (singer) albums
2010 albums